Nanda Periyasamy (born 1968) is an Indian film director, who has worked in Tamil cinema.

Career

In 2002, Nanda Periyasamy was given the opportunity to direct a police thriller film titled Mahaa with Ajith Kumar, Sneha and Kiran Rathod in the lead roles. However, the project was shelved due to an accident suffered by Ajith. His first film, Oru Kalluriyin Kathai (2005) received average reviews and a lukewarm response at the box office. 

Periyasamy then briefly worked on the pre-production of a film titled Ardhanari, which was later shelved.

In his second film, Maathi Yosi, he tackled sensitive issues like untouchability and casteism, and featured a predominantly new cast. The film received mixed reviews. During a period of time, he also took on acting roles, notably appearing in Mayandi Kudumbathar (2009) alongside nine other directors. He returned to directing in 2013 with Azhagan Azhagi, before making the romantic comedy Vanna Jigina in 2015.

Nanda Periyasamy was seen playing villain roles in the movies Sandakozhi 2 and Market Raja MBBS. Meanwhile, he emerged as the story writer of the Hindi movie Rashmi Rocket (2020), starring Tapsee Pannu and directed by Akarsh Khurana. He directed Anandham Vilayadum Veedu, which released in 2021.

Filmography

As director

As actor
Mayandi Kudumbathar (2009) as Chinna Virumaandi
Yogi (2009)
Milaga (2010)
Goripalayam (2010) as Karutha Pandi
Raa Raa (2011)
Sandakozhi 2 (2018)
Market Raja MBBS (2019)

As writer
Rashmi Rocket (2021; Hindi)

Awards 

 Filmfare Award for Best Story - South for Rashmi Rocket (2022)

References

External links

1968 births
Living people
Tamil film directors
Artists from Madurai
Film directors from Tamil Nadu
21st-century Indian film directors